Endangered Species is the second studio album by American nu metal
band Flaw. It was released on May 4, 2004. The album debuted at #42 on the Billboard 200 chart.

As explained by vocalist Chris Volz, the fairly lengthy delay between the release of Through the Eyes and Endangered Species was the result of 18 months of touring and, sequentially, the band's desire to not hastily release an album without being happy with its contents. This album marked a change in the band's sound, completely eliminating rapping from their signature style.

After the band's breakup, pre-production demos for majority of the songs on the album, in addition to 7 unreleased tracks, were made available on the internet. They were quickly taken offline after Universal had words with the webmaster of the site that had illegally distributed the tracks. The webmaster was allowed by the band to put the tracks online, but he did not have the legal rights to do so from Universal. The differences between the demo and final versions are mostly lyrical, though "Medicate" has entirely different lyrics and a different riff in the bridge.

The album spawned one single, "Recognize", which failed to receive significant radio airplay, but charted higher than any other Flaw single.

Track listing
 "Medicate" – 3:31
 "Endangered Species" – 3:45
 "Recognize" – 4:11
 "Wait for Me" – 4:34
 "Many Faces" – 3:59
 "All the Worst" – 3:57
 "You've Changed" – 3:48
 "Turn the Tables" – 3:13
 "Worlds Divide" – 5:31
 "Decide" – 4:53
 "Final Cry" – 4:07
 "Not Enough" – 4:27

Demos
The track listing below does not reflect the original track order on the band's own CD.
Album Demos
 Medicate - 3:41
 Endangered Species - 4:03
 Recognize - 5:20
 Many Faces - 4:34
 You've Changed – 4:16
 Turn the Tables – 2:33
 Worlds Divide – 5:48
 Decide - 5:10
 Final Cry - 4:42
 Not Enough - 5:16

B-Sides
 Can't Forget - 3:41
 Consequences of Emotion - 6:14
 One Step at a Time - 4:41
 Keep Me Behind -  5:37
 Nothing Else - 3:10
 Changing Places - 3:26
 Sound Your Voices - 4:29

References

Flaw (band) albums
2004 albums
Universal Records albums
Albums produced by David Bottrill

pl:Endangered Species